Pete is a given name. It is a diminutive form of the given name Peter. It is the given name of:

People
Pete Accetturo, American YouTuber and voice actor
Pete Alonso (born 1994), American baseball player
Pete Appleton (1904–1974), American baseball player
Pete Buttigieg (born 1982), American politician
Pete Berezney (1923–2008), American football player
Pete D'Alonzo (1929–2001), American football player
Pete Davidson (born 1993), American comedian
Pete Docter (born 1968), American animator, film director and producer 
Pete Fairbanks (born 1993), American baseball player
Pete Fountain (1930–2016), American clarinet player
Pete Gudauskas (1916–2003), American football player
Pete Ham (1947–1975), Welsh singer, songwriter and guitarist, member of the rock band Badfinger
Pete Hamill (1935–2020), American journalist and author
Pete Hamilton (1942–2017), American NASCAR driver
Pete Maki, American baseball coach
Pete Maravich (1948-1988), American basketball player
Pete Mikolajewski (born 1943), American football player
Pete Murray (Australian singer-songwriter) (born 1969), Australian singer-songwriter
Pete Murray (DJ) (born 1925), British radio and television presenter and actor
Pete Nice (born 1967), American rapper
Pete Perini (1928–2008), American football player
Pete Postlethwaite (1946–2011), English actor
Pete Price (born 1946), British radio presenter
Pete Ricketts (born 1964), American businessman
Pete Sampras (born 1971), American tennis player 
Pete Seeger (1919–2014), American folk singer
Pete Smith (disambiguation), multiple people
Pete Townshend (born 1945), English guitarist, singer, songwriter (The Who)
Pete Trgovich, American basketball player
Pete Walker (baseball), American baseball player and coach
Pete Wentz (born 1979), bassist of the band Fall Out Boy
Pete Werner (born 1999), American football player
Pete Woodworth (born 1988), American baseball coach

Fictional characters
 Pete Beale, on the BBC soap opera EastEnders
 Pete Campbell, on the American television series Mad Men
 Pete Miller, on the American television series The Office
 Play-Doh Pete, the mascot of Play-Doh compound who was around from 1960 to 2002
 Pete 'Maverick' Mitchell, in Top Gun
 Pete (Disney), an anthropomorphic cartoon character in Disney media
 Pete the Cat, a fictional cat from the "Pete the Cat" series of books
 Pete the Pup, from the Our Gang series of comedies
 Pete, in the movie Shaun of the Dead
 Pete & Pete, the title characters of The Adventures of Pete & Pete, an American children's television series
 Old Puffer Pete, in the TV series ChuggingtonChuggington
 Pete Crane, a construction vehicle in Putt-Putt Enters the Race
 Pete, the freight engine in The Little Engine That Could
 Pete Malloy, one of the two main characters in the TV series Adam-12
 Pete McGee, a character from The Ghost and Molly McGee
 Pete, the title character of Pete the Tramp, an American comic strip published from 1932 to 1963
 Pete Wisdom, from Marvel Comics
 Stinky Pete, a character of Woody's Roundup and the main antagonist of Toy Story 2
 Cactus Pete, the cameo husband of Cactus Polly on Oswald
 Cordwood Pete, younger brother of American folk legend Paul Bunyan
 Pete, a character in the Animal Crossing video game series
 Pete, the title character of Power Pete, a video game
 Pete, a character from Total Drama: The Ridonculous Race
 Pete Wheeler, the main character in the Backyard Sports game series

English masculine given names
Hypocorisms